The Polish Institutes is a network of establishments reporting to the Ministry of Foreign Affairs Poland.  there are 25 of them. Their mission id described as "creating a positive image of Poland abroad" by promoting Polish culture, history, science, language and national heritage. Other tasks include supporting cultural exchange, in particular, within the framework of the European Union National Institutes for Culture, as well as implementation of various international cultural programmes.

Polish institutes cooperate with local institutions and NGOs in organizing various events.

The names may slightly differ in some countries. For example, in London and New York, the institute is called "Polish Cultural Institute".

Locations

See also
Polish Institute and Sikorski Museum

References

Polish culture
Cultural organisations based in Poland
Foreign relations of Poland
Government agencies of Poland
Cultural promotion organizations